Below is a list (in the form of a (statistical) table) of all of the protected areas that were officially established as such in the year of 2012. The table contains each place's/park's/monument's name, country in which the corresponding place/park/monument is located and the total approximate area that the corresponding place/park/monument covers.

Related Wikipedia pages
2012 in the environment